Dədə Qorqud (known as Bayramovka until 1999) is a village and municipality in the Saatly Rayon of Azerbaijan. It has a population of 2,137.

References

Populated places in Saatly District